The men's golf tournament at the 2016 Summer Olympics took place at the Olympic Golf Course, built within the Reserva de Marapendi in the Barra da Tijuca zone, between 11 and 14 August 2016. It was the first such tournament in 112 years.

Sixty players took part in four rounds of stroke play. Justin Rose of Great Britain won the gold medal by two strokes over silver medalist Henrik Stenson of Sweden. It was the first gold medal for Great Britain (which had previously earned silver and bronze in 1900) and first medal of any color for Sweden, making its debut in the event. Matt Kuchar of the United States was one stroke behind Stenson and won the bronze medal. This put the American podium streak at 3 Games—and 116 years—long.

The tournament carried Official World Golf Ranking points. Rose went from 12th to 9th in the rankings as a result while Stenson went from 5th to 4th and Kuchar went from 20th to 15th.

Background
The first Olympic golf tournaments took place at the second modern Games in Paris 1900. Men's and women's events were held. Golf was featured again at the next Games, St. Louis 1904 with men's events (an individual tournament as well as a team event). The 1908 Games in London were also supposed to have a men's golf competition, but a dispute led to a boycott by all of the host nation's golfers, leaving only a single international competitor and resulting in the cancellation of the event. Golf would disappear from the Olympic programme from then until returning with this event.

Many of the top players withdrew over concerns about Zika fever. Bubba Watson, the world number 5, was the highest-ranked golfer to compete.

30 of the 34 participating nations were making their debut. The United States was the only nation to have previously competed at both of the men's individual golf tournaments in 1900 and 1904, making its third appearance in 2016. Canada (1904), France (1900), and Great Britain (1900) had each competed once previously, making their second appearance here.

Qualification

Each country qualified from one to four athletes based on World Rankings. The top 60 golfers, subject to limits per nation and guarantees for the host and continental representation, were selected. A nation could have three or four golfers if they were all in the top 15 of the rankings; otherwise, each nation was limited to two golfers. One spot was guaranteed for the host nation and five spots were guaranteed to ensure that each Olympic continent had at least one representative. Neither the host nor the continental guarantees turned out to be necessary, with Brazil qualifying one golfers normally and each continent having at least two golfers qualified.

Competition format
The tournament was a four-round stroke play tournament, with the lowest score over the total 72 holes winning.

Schedule

All times are Brasília Time (UTC-03:00)

Results

First round
Thursday, 11 August 2016

Marcus Fraser of Australia recorded nine birdies on his way to a round of 63 (−8) and a three-shot lead. Justin Rose of Great Britain became the first player to make a hole-in-one at the Games.

Second round
Friday, 12 August 2016

Marcus Fraser of Australia carded four birdies and two bogeys for a round of 69 (−2) and saw his lead reduced to one shot.

Third round
Saturday, 13 August 2016

Rose fired a 65 (−6) including two eagles to take a one-shot lead over world number five Henrik Stenson into the final round. South Africa's Jaco van Zyl, meanwhile, made a hole in one of his own at the 8th.

Final round
Sunday, 14 August 2016

Rose and Stenson continued to battle in the final group of the day and were tied at −15 going to the 18th. Rose then produced a backspin approach that left him with a 2.5-foot putt, and Stenson underhit his approach and eventually three-putted for bogey, leaving Rose with two putts to win the gold. He made the first for birdie to secure the win, becoming the first golfer to win Olympic gold in 112 years.

It was Rose's first tournament win in 10 months, having won the UBS Hong Kong Open the previous October. American Matt Kuchar, who had entered the final round tied for seventh, shot a 63 (−8) to take bronze.

References

Men
Men's events at the 2016 Summer Olympics